The Union of Black Episcopalians, formerly the Union of Black Clergy and Laity, is an organization of The Episcopal Church.

History 
The union was formed on February 8, 1968, by a group of African-American clergy who met in St. Philip's Episcopal Church to identify the church with the growing Black Power movement in their communities. 
The desire to articulate the problems of minority populations had been expressed by the Episcopal Society for Cultural and Racial Unity. 
However, it was felt that its agenda was influenced largely by white Episcopalians, and did not necessarily express the aspirations of African-Americans.

The organization meets annually, and includes clergy and laity, men and women, without distinction. Chapters are organized by dioceses and are joined in regional groups to express local concerns more effectively. The goals of the union are to help the church eradicate racism within its structure, to indicate the importance of an authentic African-American voice in decisions of diocesan and national governing bodies, to develop liturgical styles in worship, and to encourage and participate in the political and religious concerns of the African American community.

Membership 
In 2018 there were 38 chapters within seven geographical regions. The Union of Black Episcopalians convenes an annual business meeting for all members.

References 

Episcopal Church (United States)
African-American organizations
African-American Christianity
1968 establishments in New York City
Organizations established in 1968